Anthony Longford Mann (8 November 1945 – 15 November 2019) was an Australian cricketer who played in four Test matches during the 1977/78 season.

He was only the second man in history to score a century in a Test match after being sent in as nightwatchman.

Career
Born in Middle Swan, Western Australia, Mann was a leg break bowler with a sharp googly. He was almost selected for 1969–70 Australian Second XI Tour of New Zealand when the Test players were in India and South Africa. A useful batsman, he made the Test side during the first season of the Packer schism.

He was in England during 1971-72 when, while playing at club level for Lancashire's Bacup Cricket Club, he also appeared at county level for Shropshire.

He was selected to play against the touring Indian side, being picked over Jim Higgs due in part because of his better batting. Mann took 3–12 in the first innings of the First Test and also making useful scores of 19 and 26 in a closely fought match. He was less successful in the second innings as a bowler, taking 0–52.

In the Second Test he found the going harder against the Indian batsmen, taking 0–63 and 0–49. However, in the second innings, when Australia was chasing 339 to win the game, Mann came to the wicket as nightwatchman when Australia was 1–13 and did not leave until they were 2–172 by which time he had scored 105 runs, helping lay the platform for an Australian victory.

He was used sparingly as a bowler in the Third Test and in the Fourth Test he was dismissed for a pair and took 0–101. He was dropped in favour of fellow West Australian Bruce Yardley for the Fifth Test and never played for Australia again.

Family and personal life
His father was Jack Mann, a pioneer of the wine industry in Western Australia.

Mann was a schoolteacher for 30 years before becoming manager for the WACA, Adam Gilchrist becoming among his notable recruits to the Western Australia cricket team. He died of pancreatic cancer at St John of God Murdoch Hospital in November 2019 aged 74.

References

External links

1945 births
2019 deaths
Australia Test cricketers
Western Australia cricketers
Place of birth missing
International Cavaliers cricketers
Australian cricketers
Shropshire cricketers
Cricketers from Perth, Western Australia
Sportsmen from Western Australia